Ishikawa's frog (Odorrana ishikawae) is a species of frog in the family Ranidae. It is endemic to Okinawa Island, one of the Ryukyu Islands of Japan. It has been described as the most beautiful frog in Japan.

Its natural habitats are temperate forests, rivers, and intermittent rivers. It is threatened by habitat loss.

References

External links

Odorrana
Endemic amphibians of Japan
Endemic fauna of the Ryukyu Islands
Endangered biota of Asia
Taxonomy articles created by Polbot
Amphibians described in 1901
Taxa named by Leonhard Stejneger